Leonidas R. Wyatt House is a historic home in Raleigh, Wake County, North Carolina.  It was built in 1881-1882 and is a two-story, "Triple-A" frame I-house with Italianate-style design elements. It has two one-story real ells connected by a hyphen. It has a hipped and shed-roofed wing added in the early 20th century and a small second-story, shed-roofed rear wing added in the 1920s. It was moved to its present location in June 1988.

It was listed on the National Register of Historic Places in 1990.

References

Houses on the National Register of Historic Places in North Carolina
Italianate architecture in North Carolina
Houses completed in 1882
Houses in Raleigh, North Carolina
National Register of Historic Places in Raleigh, North Carolina